The 1955 Rutgers Scarlet Knights football team represented Rutgers University in the 1955 college football season. In their 14th and final season under head coach Harvey Harman, the Scarlet Knights compiled a 3–5 record and were outscored by their opponents 22 to 13.

Schedule

References

Rutgers
Rutgers Scarlet Knights football seasons
Rutgers Scarlet Knights football